Ronald Harold Nessen (born May 25, 1934) is an American government official who served as the 15th White House Press Secretary for President Gerald Ford from 1974 to 1977.  He replaced Jerald terHorst, who resigned in the wake of President Ford's pardon of former president Richard Nixon.

Prior to joining the Ford administration, Nessen served as a Washington, D.C. correspondent for NBC News. On the day of Ford's succession to the presidency, August 9, 1974, he provided commentary. That evening he was on the NBC Nightly News; in that piece, Nessen reported on the appointment of Jerald terHorst, the man whom he would succeed one month later.

Nessen, who also served NBC News as a war correspondent during the Vietnam War, was seriously wounded by grenade fragments while on patrol outside Pleiku in the Central Highlands in July 1966. He was with cameraman Peter Boultwood when he was wounded.

Nessen was a member of the Peabody Awards Board of Jurors from 1996 to 2003, and served as Chair in 2003.

Quotes
 "Nobody believes the official spokesman but everybody trusts an unidentified source."

Works
Nessen, Ron. It Sure Looks Different on the Inside. Playboy Press, 1979.
Nessen, Ron. The First Lady
Nessen, Ron. The Hour
Nessen, Ron and Neuman, Johanna. Death with Honors
Nessen, Ron and Neuman, Johanna. Press Corpse
Nessen, Ron and Neuman, Johanna. Knight and Day

Saturday Night Live
On April 17, 1976, Nessen was the first political figure to host Saturday Night Live. His episode is also known for having Gerald Ford open the show with the "Live from New York, it's Saturday night!" tagline.

On a previous episode, Ron Nessen had been portrayed by Buck Henry.

References

External links

Ron Nessen at the Ford Presidential Library
Brookings Institution press release on Nessen's becoming VP of Communications there
Ron Nessen on Saturday Night Live

1934 births
American University alumni
Living people
NBC News people
Writers from Washington, D.C.
White House Press Secretaries